Tuckingmill or Tucking Mill may refer to:

Fulling mill, part of the textile industry

Places
 Tucking Mill, a hamlet in Somerset, England
 Tuckingmill, Camborne, Cornwall, a village in Camborne, Cornwall, England
 Tuckingmill, St Breward, Cornwall, England
 Tuckingmill, Wiltshire, England